Abovyan (Armenian: Աբովյան) is a town in the Kotayk Province, Armenia.

Abovyan may also refer to:

Abovyan City Stadium 
FC Abovyan based in Abovyan City
Saint John the Baptist Church, Abovyan
Abovyan mine in Kotayk Province, Armenia
Abovyan, Ararat, a village in Armenia
Khachatur Abovian (1809–1848), Armenian writer
Abovyan Street in Yerevan, Armenia
Khachatur Abovyan Park in Yerevan, Armenia
Yuriy Abovyan (born 1931), Soviet swimmer